Igor Ignatushkin (born April 7, 1984) is a Russian professional ice hockey centre who is currently playing with CSK VVS Samara of the Supreme Hockey League (VHL). Ignatushki was selected by Washington Capitals in the 8th round (242nd overall) of the 2002 NHL Entry Draft. He played three years with HC Sochi before signing as a free agent to a one-year contract with Dynamo Moscow on July 7, 2017.

Career statistics

Regular season and playoffs

International

References

External links

1984 births
Living people
Amur Khabarovsk players
Atlant Moscow Oblast players
HC Dynamo Moscow players
HC Košice players
HC Ryazan players
HC Sibir Novosibirsk players
HC Sochi players
People from Elektrostal
Russian ice hockey centres
Washington Capitals draft picks
Sportspeople from Moscow Oblast
Expatriate ice hockey players in Uzbekistan
Expatriate ice hockey players in Slovakia
Russian expatriate ice hockey people
Russian expatriate sportspeople in Uzbekistan
Russian expatriate sportspeople in Slovakia